The Nanping dialect, or Nanping Mandarin, is a dialect of Mandarin Chinese spoken in Yanping District, in Nanping, Fujian. Locally, it is known as Tuguanhua. It is one of three Mandarin dialect islands in Fujian.

History and distribution
In the past, Nanping Mandarin had great influence in northern Fujian. During the Republican Era, this dialect of Mandarin was taught as the standard in many schools in the area. However, since Yanping is surrounded by areas where Eastern and Northern Min are spoken, the areas where Nanping Mandarin is still spoken has shrunk down. During the Second Sino-Japanese War, when Fuzhou was under Japanese control, many people moved from Fuzhou into Nanping, and because of closer association with the provincial capital since the founding of the People's Republic of China, Fuzhounese became more popular, and speakers of Nanping Mandarin became fewer in number.

Nanping Mandarin is still spoken in these parts of Yanping District:
 the centre of the district;
 the seat of Xiqin Town;
 parts of Shuinan Subdistrict, including Baxian, Geping, Lingxia Bridge and Houlingxia;
 Jixi, in Nanshan Town.

Phonology

Consonants
There are fourteen consonants in the phonemic inventory:

Tones
Nanping Mandarin is traditionally considered to have five tones by diachronic convention, but it may be analyzed as having four phonemic tones.

Notes

References
 
 
 
 

Languages of China
Mandarin Chinese